Baiyun Dongping station, is a station of Line 14 of the Guangzhou Metro. It started operations on 28 December 2018.

The station has an underground island platform. Platform 1 is for trains heading to Dongfeng, whilst platform 2 is for trains heading to Jiahewanggang, along with 2 unused bypass tracks next to the stopping tracks, separated by a wall.

Exits
There are 4 exits, lettered A, B, E and F. Exit A is accessible. All exits are located on Guangcong 1st Road.

Gallery

References

 Railway stations in China opened in 2018
 Guangzhou Metro stations in Baiyun District